Sambava  is a city and commune (commune urbaine) at the east coast of northern Madagascar. It is the capital of Sambava District and Sava Region. The population of the commune was 84,039 in as of the 2018 commune census.

Infrastructure
Sambava is located on Route Nationale 5a Ambilobe - Antalaha. It is also the starting point of the National road 3b to Andapa. It has a local airport,  regional airport. In addition to primary schooling the town offers secondary education at both junior and senior levels. The town provides access to hospital services to its citizens.

Economy
Farming and raising livestock provides employment for 45% and 0.5% of the working population.  The most important crop is vanilla, while other important products are coconut and rice. Industry and services provide employment for 0.5% and 53.5% of the population, respectively. Additionally fishing employs 0.5% of the population.

Sambava disposes of white, sandy beaches with several hotels.  The Marojejy National Park is close to Sambava on the road to Andapa.

Commune
The municipality of Sambava covers the surrounding 16 fokontany (villages): Ambia, Antohomaro, Ambodisatrana I, Amboisatrana II, Sambava centre, Antaimby, Antsirabe-Nord, Antanifotsy I, Antanifotsy II, Ambariomihambana, Ambohitrakongona, Ampisasahanala, Analamandrorofo, Ambatofitatra, Ampandrozonana, Besopaka, Menagisy, and Soavinandriana.

Sports
 FC Joel Sava (regional football champion 2010, 2011, 2015 & 2016).

Climate

References and notes 

Cities in Madagascar
Populated places in Sava Region
Regional capitals in Madagascar